Leakey may refer to:

Leakey, Texas, U.S., a city
Leakey (crater), a lunar impact crater
Leakey (surname)
7958 Leakey, an asteroid
Leakey Independent School District, a public school district based in Leakey, Texas

See also
Leak (disambiguation)